Bulwark Bazooka is a 2014 album by the German industrial music project Wumpscut.

Track listing
 “Rubber Corpse” – 4:07
 “Furunkel Lolita” – 4:19
 “Cross Of Iron” – 5:18
 “Atrocity Dancer” – 5:31
 “Heresy” – 3:46
 “Supergurl” – 4:01
 “Vienna” – 5:32
 “Pagan Crusade” – 5:08
 “Flesh Trench” – 5:34
 “RTL Hariti” – 6:58

2014 albums
Wumpscut albums